Turkey was represented in the Eurovision Song Contest 1988 by a music trio named Mazhar Fuat Özkan (names of the members) with the song "Sufi", written and composed by the trio.

Before Eurovision

12. Eurovision Şarkı Yarışması Türkiye Finali 
The national final featured songs written by seventeen composers directly invited by TRT. However, Attila Özdemiroğlu, one of the invited composers, did not submit a song for unknown reasons.

The final took place on 13 February 1988 at the TRT Studios in Ankara, hosted by Canan Kumbasar. Sixteen songs competed and the winner was determined by an expert jury. As there was a tie at the end of the voting, the head of the jury selected "Sufi" performed by MFÖ as the winner.

At Eurovision
On the night of the contest Mahzar Fuat Özkan performed fifth, after the United Kingdom and before the Netherlands. At the close of the voting Sufi had received 37 points, placing Turkey fifteenth. 8 participants had voted for Sufi. In the 1985 contest Turkey had received 37 points from 8 countries. Atilla Şereftuğ, the composer of the winner ("Ne partez pas sans moi" by Celine Dion) was a Turk living in Switzerland. The Turkish jury awarded its 12 points to the United Kingdom.

Voting

References 

1988
Countries in the Eurovision Song Contest 1988
Eurovision